The Polish Chemical Society is a professional scientific society of Polish chemists.

History
The society was founded of 118 Charter Members on 29 June 1919 on the initiative of Leon Marchlewski, Stanisław Bądzyński and Ignacy Mościcki, future President of Poland who was a chemist himself. The initial aim of the organization was to bring together Polish chemists previously working under different partitions as well as from abroad. The Polish Chemical Society initiated a series of scientific conferences as well as founded Poland's first chemistry journal Roczniki Chemii.

After the Second World War, the society was reactivated in 1946 and continues its activities until today. It has 1,959 members, who work in 20 regional centres. In 2006, the Polish Chemical Society became a public benefit organization.

The statute states that one of the goals of the society is ‘‘the encouragement of progress of chemical science and propagation thereof among the public, as well as representation of the professional interests of chemists, both researchers and those industrially employed’’.

Awards of the Polish Chemical society
The society confers the following awards:
Jędrzej Śniadecki Medal - the highest distinction presented by the society for outstanding achievements in chemistry (first awarded in 1965)
Marie Curie Medal - an award presented to chemists working abroad (first awarded in 1996)
Kołos Medal - an award presented for outstanding achievements in theoretical chemistry and physical chemistry (first awarded in 1998)
Wiktor Kemula Medal - an award presented jointly with the Polish Academy of Sciences for significant contributions in analytical chemistry (first awarded in 1998)
Stanisław Kostanecki Medal - an award presented for achievements in organic chemistry (first awarded in 1978)
Jan Zawidzki Medal - an award presented for achievements in physical chemistry and inorganic chemistry (first awarded in 1979)
Ignacy Mościcki Medal - an award presented for achievements in industrial chemistry (first awarded in 2000)
Jan Harabaszewski Medal - an award presented for didactic achievements in popularizing the field of chemistry (first awarded in 1990)
Zofia Matysikowa Medal - an award presented for best teachers of chemistry
Bogusława and Włodzimierz Trzebiatowski Medal - an award for achievements in inorganic chemistry

Honorary members
Currently there are 148 honorary members of the society including Henry Louis Le Chatelier, Paul Sabatier, Marie Curie, Józef Boguski, Ignacy Mościcki, Henry Edward Armstrong, Bohuslav Brauner, Victor Grignard, Hans von Euler-Chelpin, Leon Marchlewski, Jaroslav Heyrovsky, Kazimierz Fajans, S. P. L. Sørensen, Leopold Ružička, Ilya Prigogine, Theodor Svedberg, Max Bodenstein, Richard Kuhn, Irving Langmuir, Robert Robinson, Roger Adams, Ronald G.W. Norrish, Krishnasami Venkataraman, Alan R. Katritzky and Rolf Huisgen.

See also
European Chemical Society
Polish Physical Society
Polish Mathematical Society

References 

Scientific societies based in Poland
Chemistry societies
Scientific organizations established in 1919
1919 establishments in Poland